This page is a list of all GAA Rounders All Star Awards winners from 2002 to present. These awards are presented annually to the best Irish rounders players.

Men

2002

2003

2004

2005

2006

2007

2008

2009

Women

2002

2003

2004

2005

2006

2007

2008

2009

References

2002 establishments in Ireland
Awards established in 2002
Gaelic games awards
Rounders